Clare Abbott (born 28 July 1986) is an Irish eventing rider. Representing Ireland, she competed at the 2014 World Equestrian Games and at the 2013 European Eventing Championships.

Her current best championship result is 29th place in individual eventing from the 2013 Europeans held in Malmö, Sweden.

Abbott has been selected to compete at the 2016 Summer Olympics in Rio de Janeiro with her Irish Sport Horse Euro Prince.

CCI 5* Results

International Championship Results

References

External links
 
 
 

Living people
1986 births
Irish female equestrians
Equestrians at the 2016 Summer Olympics
Olympic equestrians of Ireland
21st-century Irish women